David Lamb may refer to:

David Lamb (baseball) (born 1975), American baseball player
David Lamb (journalist) (1940–2016), Los Angeles Times correspondent
David Lamb (musician) (1977–2014), founder and leader of Brown Bird